Dalea candida var. oligophylla, the western prairie clover, is a perennial plant in the legume family (Fabaceae) found in the Colorado Plateau and Canyonlands region of the southwestern United States.

References

candida var. oligophylla
Endemic flora of the United States
Flora of Arizona
Flora of Utah
Flora of the Colorado Plateau and Canyonlands region